Beauval Indian Residential School (1895–1983) near the northern village of Beauval, Saskatchewan was a Canadian residential school operated by the Roman Catholic Church for First Nations children. It was run by the Missionary Oblates of Mary Immaculate and the Grey Nuns.

The school was on what is now the La Plonge 192 reserve across the Beaver River from Beauval. La Plonge 192 is part of the English River Dene Nation and had 115 residents in 2011.

A fire on September 19–20, 1927, and an influenza epidemic in 1937 took the lives of many students.

History

The Beauval Indian Residential School opened in 1895 and closed in 1983. It then became the Meadow Lake Tribal Council's Beauval Indian Education Centre, which closed in 1995. The main building was demolished in the summer of 1995.

In 1911 when Bishop Charlebois visited the school he wrote that all the 44 children there were taught both French and English but that the use of French dominated.
In 1927 there were 37 students in the school, 18 girls and 19 boys, when the wooden building was destroyed by fire. All the boys perished.

In 1931 with the promise of a $75,000.00 grant from the Federal government a new school was started and was almost complete in January 1932. The school was made with bricks produced locally.

In 1937 a flu epidemic took the lives of more students.

Fire of 1927

During the night of September 19–20, 1927 the fire alarm rang while thirty-seven students and eight Grey Nuns were sleeping. "The fire started at the centre of the building close to the furnaces. It spread into the hallway and into the boy's dormitory and closed the outside exits. The children tried to save themselves through an inside staircase but were stopped by the flames. The whole boy's dormitory was in flames.
The older girls were heroic in guiding the younger girls to safety. Father Francois Gagnon almost suffocated. In the blink of an eye the building was totally engulfed in flames. The furnaces had been checked just three days previously. 
Sister Lea (Elise Bellerose) and nineteen boys, from the ages of 7 to 12, died." wrote the principal of the school Father Mederic Adam. (translation) "The burnt remains of the twenty victims were buried in two caskets." wrote Father Penard.(translation)

The following list of boys who died in the fire was taken from the memorial monument.

Marcel Lemaigre age 7
Jimmy Iron age 8
Alex Opikokew age 8
Simon Sayers (Sayesc) age 8
Raphael Corrigal age 9
Jules Coulionner age 9
Samuel Gardiner age 9
Roderique Iron age 10
Joseph Sayers (Sayesc) age 10
Thomas Alcrow age 11
Freddy Bishop age 11
Antoine Durocher age 11
Patrice Grosventre age 11
Frank Kimbley age 11
Alfred Laliberté age 11
Moise Larivière age 11
Zéphrin Morin age 11
Albert Sylvestre age 11
Ernest Bishop age 12

Epidemic of February 1937

See also
 Canadian Indian residential school system
 List of residential schools in Canada

References 

Residential schools in Saskatchewan
School fire disasters
1927 in Saskatchewan
Fires in Canada
Disasters in Saskatchewan
1927 fires in North America
September 1927 events